Hobart Baumann Amstutz (18 September 1896 – 26 February 1980) was a bishop of the American Methodist Church and the United Methodist Church, elected in 1956.

Early years
He was born  in Henrietta, Ohio, United States.  He graduated in 1915 from Oberlin High School, Oberlin, Ohio, and attended Baldwin-Wallace College for two years before being drafted into the army in World War I. After the war, he earned in 1921 his A.B. degree from Northwestern University and in 1923 his Bachelor of Divinity degree from Garrett Theological Seminary and M.A. from Northwestern University. In 1938, Baldwin-Wallace College awarded him an honorary D.D. Hobart had 2 brothers Clarence John "Stutz" Amstutz and Melvin Amstutz. Clarence had 3 children C. John Amstutz, Grethen (Amstutz) Timmons and Virginia (Amstutz) Wilhelm.

Missionary service

Rev. Amstutz served as a missionary in South East Asia beginning in 1926.  For many years, he was pastor of the Wesley Methodist Church in Singapore.  In 1942, he was imprisoned by the Japanese, spending three and a half years in a prison camp. From 1956 to 1964, he served as elected Methodist Bishop for Southeast Asia (Singapore, Malaysia, Indonesia, and Burma) and also served as founding President of Trinity College in Singapore. Shortly after retirement, he was called to be Methodist Bishop of Pakistan from 1964 to 1968, where he succeeded in creating the Church of Pakistan, an amalgamation of four Protestant churches.

Death
Bishop Amstutz died on 26 February 1980, aged 83, in Claremont, California.  He was survived by his wife, Celeste; a son, Bruce, who was serving as a U.S. diplomat in Afghanistan; a daughter Beverly, and a brother, Clarence.

See also
 List of bishops of the United Methodist Church

References
Oberlin Alumni Magazine, The, Oberlin, Ohio, March/April 1980, pp. 43–44.
Oberlin High School Alumni "In Memoriam" 
The Council of Bishops of the United Methodist Church 
J. Bruce Amstutz (son), memoirs.

External links

1896 births
1980 deaths
20th-century Methodist bishops
American Methodist missionaries
American expatriates in Pakistan
American expatriates in Singapore
American Methodist bishops
Bishops of The Methodist Church (USA)
Methodist missionaries in Pakistan
Garrett–Evangelical Theological Seminary alumni
Methodist missionaries in Singapore
Northwestern University alumni
People from Lorain County, Ohio
World War II civilian prisoners held by Japan
United States Army personnel of World War I
United States Army soldiers
Christians from Ohio
American prisoners of war in World War II